HMS Serapis was an S-class destroyer of the British Royal Navy. The ship was built by Scotts Shipbuilding and Engineering Company from 1941 to 1943, and was launched on 25 March 1943 and completed on 25 December 1943.

Serapis operated with the Home Fleet during the Second World War, escorting Arctic Convoys and taking part in the Invasion of Normandy in 1944. After the end of the war, the ship was sold to The Netherlands, being renamed HNLMS Piet Hein. Piet Hein served in Indonesian War of Independence and the Korean War. She was sold for scrap in 1962.

Design and construction
The British Admiralty ordered the eight destroyers of the S class on 9 January 1941 as the 5th Emergency Flotilla.  The S class were War Emergency Programme destroyers, intended for general duties, including use as anti-submarine escort, and were to be suitable for mass-production. They were based on the hull and machinery of the pre-war J-class destroyers, but with a lighter armament (effectively whatever armament was available) in order to speed production.

Displacement was  standard and  full load.

The ship had a main gun armament of four 4.7-inch (120 mm) QF Mk. IX guns, capable of elevating to an angle of 55 degrees, giving a degree of anti-aircraft capability. The close-in anti-aircraft armament was one Hazemayer stabilised twin mount for the Bofors 40 mm gun and eight Oerlikon 20 mm cannons (four twin mounts). Two quadruple mounts for 21-inch (533 mm) torpedoes were fitted, while the ship had an depth charge outfit of four depth charge mortars and two racks, with a total of 70 charges carried.

Serapis was fitted with a Type 272 surface warning radar and a high-frequency direction finding (HF/DF) aerial on the ship's lattice foremast, together with a Type 291 air warning radar on a pole mast aft. A Type 285 fire control radar integrated with the ship's high-angle gun director, while the Hazemayer mount had an integrated Type 282 radar. She had a crew of 179 officers and other ranks.

Serapis  was laid down at Scotts', Greenock shipyard on 14 August 1941 and was launched on 25 March 1943. She was completed on 23 December 1943, and assigned the pennant number G94.

Service

Royal Navy
After commissioning and workup, Serapis joined the 23rd Destroyer Flotilla of the Home Fleet based at Scapa Flow. On 22 February 1944, Serapis joined the ocean escort for the Arctic Convoy JW 57, remaining with it until arriving at the Kola Inlet on 28 February and also escorted the return convoy RA 57 from Russia to Loch Ewe. On 29 March, Serapis joined the next Russia bound convoy, JW 58, escorting it until 4 April and the return convoy RA 58 from 29 March until 4 April.

In June 1944, Serapis, along with the rest of the 23rd Flotilla, took part in the Allied Invasion of France, supporting landings on Sword Beach on 6 June, and continuing to provide gunfire support for the fighting on land and carry out escort operations until August.

From 7–12 December 1944, Serapis took part in Operation Urbane, a minelaying and anti-shipping survey by the carriers ,  and Trumpeter. From 1 January to 8 January 1945, Serapis escorted Convoy JW 63 to the Kola Inlet, and from 11 to 21 January, the return Convoy RA 63 back to Loch Ewe. Serapis formed part of the ocean escort for Arctic Convoy JW 64 from 6 to 15 February and the return convoy RA 64 from 17 to 28 February, her last Arctic Convoy. Carrier sweeps against Norwegian coastal waters continued, with Serapis taking part in Operation Cupola (escorting , Premier and ) from 19 to 21 March and Operations Muscular and Prefix (escorting Searcher, Puncher, Queen and ) from 24 to 29 March 1945. From 31 March to 17 June 1945, Serapis was refitted at Immingham and then returned to the Home Fleet, carrying out occupation duties at Wilhelmshaven in July.

Royal Netherlands Navy
Serapis was commissioned into Netherlands service on 5 October 1945, with the new name Piet Hein. She left Sheerness on 28 October on passage for Batavia in the Dutch East Indies via the Mediterranean and Ceylon. She took part in the Indonesian War of Independence, as the Dutch attempted to regain control of the East Indies from the Indonesian nationalists, and this led to Australian dock workers refusing to carry out repairs on Piet Hein in June 1946. Piet Hein was also credited with destroying a North Korean train during the war.

On 12 August 1954, Piet Hein along with the destroyers Marnix and Evertsen, escorted the Norwegian Royal Yacht , carrying King Haakon VII of Norway on a Royal Visit to the Netherlands, to Ijmuiden. Piet Hein had her anti-aircraft armament modified in 1956–57, becoming six Bofors 40 mm guns. She was converted to a fast frigate from 1957 to 1958, with a helicopter pad being fitted aft of the ship's funnel, with the ship's armament unchanged. Piet Hein recommissioned on 1 July 1958, but was sold for scrap in 1962, being broken up at Ghent from 30 May 1962.

References

Publications

External links

 HMS SERAPIS (G 94) -  S-class Destroyer at Naval-history.com

 

S and T-class destroyers
Ships built on the River Clyde
1943 ships
World War II destroyers of the United Kingdom
S-class destroyers of the Royal Netherlands Navy